Keith Zotti is a Paralympic lawn bowler from Australia. He competed at the 1984 New York/Stoke Mandeville Paralympics winning a bronze medal in the Men's Pairs A2/4 event.

References

Paralympic lawn bowls players of Australia
Lawn bowls players at the 1984 Summer Paralympics
Paralympic bronze medalists for Australia
Living people
Australian male bowls players
Year of birth missing (living people)
Medalists at the 1984 Summer Paralympics
Paralympic medalists in lawn bowls
20th-century Australian people